John Nicholas (24 July 1879 in Allahabad – 29 September 1929) was a British footballer who competed in the 1900 Olympic Games. In Paris he won a gold medal as a member of Upton Park club team.

References

External links

1879 births
1929 deaths
English footballers
Olympic gold medallists for Great Britain
Olympic footballers of Great Britain
Footballers at the 1900 Summer Olympics
Upton Park F.C. players
Olympic medalists in football
Association football forwards
Medalists at the 1900 Summer Olympics
Sportspeople from Allahabad
Place of death missing